The Assembly Rooms Theatre is a historic 220-seat proscenium arch theatre located in the centre of Durham. During term time, it primarily hosts the work of Durham Student Theatre's 27 resident companies, and also presents the work of external and touring companies at other points in the year. The theatre is managed by Experience Durham, a department of Durham University, and is run by two full-time members of staff alongside a team of student volunteers.

History 
Built in the eighteenth century, the Assembly Rooms Theatre originally functioned as a ballroom, before being chosen to be redeveloped as a theatre after Durham's Theatre Royal burnt down in a fire in 1869. Its first dramatic performance, Il Trovatore, was presented in 1891. In 1903, the theatre hosted what is believed to be Durham's first film showing, with W.S. Porter's The Great Train Robbery.

After their first production of H.M.S. Pinafore in 1909, the theatre continued to be used extensively by Durham Amateur Operatic Group in the early twentieth century, until its acquisition by Durham University in 1930. Further renovation was carried out in the 1950s in order to enable theatrical performances to be hosted in The Assembly Rooms Theatre once again. From 2007-9 the theatre was refurbished once again, funded by the Gillian Dickinson Trust. This included a complete refurbishment of the auditorium, foyer and box office.

Shows 
During term time, The Assembly Rooms Theatre usually hosts at least one production per week These student performances are programmed by the Durham Student Theatre committee, and can feature any of the society's 27 different theatre companies.

The theatre annually participates in Durham Drama Festival in February. The theatre also participates in Durham Festival of the Arts in June, a collaborative venture between Music Durham and Durham Student Theatre to present a programme of musical and theatrical performances from Durham University students.

Outside of term time, the theatre hosts external companies and touring productions.

References

External links 
 The Assembly Rooms Theatre website
 Durham Student Theatre website

Theatres in England